Get to You may refer to:

"Get to You" (James Morrison song), a 2009 song by British pop singer James Morrison
"Get to You" (Michael Ray song), a 2017 song by American country music singer Michael Ray
"Get to You", a song in  time signature on the Byrds' 1968 album The Notorious Byrd Brothers
, a 1988 single by American band Dan Reed Network